Volcán de Flores is the most prominent stratovolcano in a volcanic field composed of several small volcanoes in southern Guatemala. It is located approximately 10 km west of the city of Jutiapa.

See also
 List of volcanoes in Guatemala

References 
 

Flores
Flores